Palmer's Bar is a dive bar and music venue located in the Cedar-Riverside neighborhood of Minneapolis, Minnesota. Known for its strong drinks, the bar serves as a live music venue at night.

The bar was founded in 1906 and has had over a dozen owners. A speakeasy during the Prohibition Era, the bar is rumored to have once had a secret tunnel connecting it to 5 Corners Saloon (vacant as of 2022). In the 1930s, it was named Carl's Bar and a brothel operated upstairs. The bar was named Palmer's in 1950 by then owner Henry Palmer. A Mr. Folta ran the bar from 1959 to 1975. His son Roger Folta co-owned the bar from 1975 to 1996. Keith Berg and Lisa Hammer purchased the bar in 2001.

Under Berg and Hammer's ownership, the bar remained open every day of the year. The bar shares a wall with a mosque, the Dar Al-Hijrah Islamic Civic Center. Scenes for the 2005 indie film Factotum were filmed inside Palmer's.

During the summer, Palmer's hosts a music festival known as "Palmfest". Musicians "Spider" John Koerner, Charlie Parr, Willie Murphy, and Cornbread Harris have played the venue. Local blues musicians Koerner, Dave "Snaker" Ray, and Tony Glover of Koerner, Ray & Glover also played the venue and would also gather at Palmer's after their shows. Bonnie Raitt frequented the bar while she was recording her debut album.

Palmer's has a "wall of shame", listing people who have been 86'd from the bar. There is also a "Wall of Deceased" that features former owner Keith Berg, who died in September 2015.

Reception
Esquire magazine named Palmer's one of the best bars in the United States in 2014. The magazine recommended a bourbon neat with a beer back and said of the bar, "There are dives and dives in this world. There's the type Guy Fieri calls out, old joints that might not feel like they need to get their hair done before seeing company but are nonetheless fundamentally clean and comfortable and unchallenging. Then there's Palmer's." They praised the bar's Wall of Shame, their outdoor garden, and the cheap drinks. Following the listing, owner Berg indicated he would preserve the bar's character and inform the staff that there would be "no bow ties or blenders."

See also
 List of dive bars

References

External links
Official website

1906 establishments in Minnesota
Buildings and structures in Minneapolis
Companies based in Minneapolis
Culture of Minneapolis
Dive bars in the United States
Drinking establishments in Minnesota
Music venues in Minnesota